Moses Sorovi (born 15 January 1996) is an Australian rugby union player who plays as a Scrum-half for the Super Rugby team the . He has also represented Australia at Schoolboy's level.

On 15 June 2021, Sorovi was named in the Fiji squad for the matches against New Zealand.

Super Rugby statistics

References 

Australian rugby union players
1996 births
Living people
Queensland Reds players
Brisbane City (rugby union) players
Melbourne Rebels players
Rugby union players from Queensland
Rugby union scrum-halves